Petri Haapimaa (born 18 June 1976) is a retired Finnish professional football defender who now coaches. He played for FinnPa in the Veikkausliiga.

References

1976 births
Finnish footballers
Veikkausliiga players
FinnPa players
Living people
Association football defenders